, also known by his Chinese style name , was a bureaucrat of the Ryukyu Kingdom.

Biography
Ikegusuku Antō was the second head of an aristocrat family called Mō-uji Ikegusuku Dunchi. His father was Aragusuku Anki.

Antō served as a member of Sanshikan during Shō Gen and Shō Ei's reign. He was dispatched as congratulatory envoy to Ming China together with Sai Chōki to celebrate the investiture of Crown Prince Zhu Yijun (later Wanli Emperor) in 1569.

Disappearance
In 1579, Chinese envoys would come to Ryukyu to install Shō Ei as the new king. But Ryukyu was suffering from famine in this year. Antō was sent to China to ask for postponement, but his ship was caught in a storm and disappeared in the sea and was never seen again.

See also
List of people who disappeared mysteriously at sea

References

|-

1570s missing person cases
16th-century Ryukyuan people
Deaths due to shipwreck at sea
Missing person cases in China
People lost at sea
People of the Ryukyu Kingdom
Ryukyuan people
Sanshikan
Ueekata
Year of death unknown